Narmer (meaning "painful catfish," "stinging catfish," "harsh catfish," or "fierce catfish;" (reign beginning at a date estimated to fall in the range 3273–2987 BC) was an ancient Egyptian pharaoh of the Early Dynastic Period. He was the successor to the Protodynastic king Ka. Many scholars consider him the unifier of Egypt and founder of the First Dynasty, and in turn the first king of a unified Egypt. He also had a prominently noticeable presence in Canaan, compared to his predecessors and successors. A majority of Egyptologists believe that Narmer was the same person as Menes. Neithhotep is thought to be his queen consort or his daughter.

Historical identity

Although highly interrelated, the questions of "who was Menes?" and "who unified Egypt?" are actually two separate issues. Narmer is often credited with the unification of Egypt by means of the conquest of Lower Egypt by Upper Egypt. While Menes is traditionally considered the first king/pharaoh of Ancient Egypt, Narmer has been identified by the majority of Egyptologists as the same person as Menes. Although vigorously debated (Hor-Aha, Narmer's successor, is the primary alternative identified as Menes by many authorities), the predominant opinion is that Narmer was Menes.

The issue is confusing because "Narmer" is a Horus name while "Menes" is a Sedge and Bee name (personal or birth name). All of the King Lists which began to appear in the New Kingdom era list the personal names of the kings, and almost all begin with Menes, or begin with divine and/or semi-divine rulers, with Menes as the first "human king". The difficulty is aligning the contemporary archaeological evidence which lists Horus Names with the King Lists that list personal names.

Two documents have been put forward as proof either that Narmer was Menes or alternatively Hor-Aha was Menes. The first is the "Naqada Label" found at the site of Naqada, in the tomb of Queen Neithhotep, often assumed to have been the mother of Horus Aha. The label shows a serekh of Hor-Aha next to an enclosure inside of which are symbols that have been interpreted by some scholars as the name "Menes". The second is the seal impression from Abydos that alternates between a serekh of Narmer and the chessboard symbol, "mn", which is interpreted as an abbreviation of Menes. Arguments have been made with regard to each of these documents in favour of Narmer or Hor-Aha being Menes, but in neither case is the argument conclusive.

The second document, the seal impression from Abydos, shows the serekh of Narmer alternating with the gameboard sign (mn), together with its phonetic complement, the n sign, which is always shown when the full name of Menes is written, again representing the name “Menes”. At first glance, this would seem to be strong evidence that Narmer was Menes. However, based on an analysis of other early First Dynasty seal impressions, which contain the name of one or more princes, the seal impression has been interpreted by other scholars as showing the name of a prince of Narmer named Menes, hence Menes was Narmer's successor, Hor-Aha, and thus Hor-Aha was Menes.

Two necropolis sealings, found in 1985 and 1991 in Abydos (Umm el-Qa'ab), in or near the tombs of Den and Qa'a, show Narmer as the first king on each list, followed by Hor-Aha. The Qa'a sealing lists all eight of the kings of what scholars now call the First Dynasty in the correct order, starting with Narmer. These necropolis sealings are strong evidence that Narmer was the first king of the First Dynasty and hence is the same person as Menes.

Name

The complete spelling of Narmer's name consists of the hieroglyphs for a catfish (nꜥr){{efn| Although the catfish portrayed in Narmer's name has sometimes been described as an "electric catfish", based on its fin configuration, it is actually of the non-electric Heterobranchus genus.}} and a chisel (mr), hence the reading "Narmer" (using the rebus principle). This word is sometimes translated as "raging catfish". However, there is no consensus on this reading. Other translations of the adjective before "catfish" include "angry", "fighting", "fierce", "painful", "furious", "bad", "evil", "biting", "menacing", and "stinging". Some scholars have taken entirely different approaches to reading the name that do not include "catfish" in the name at all, but these approaches have not been generally accepted.

Rather than incorporating both hieroglyphs, Narmer's name is often shown in an abbreviated form with just the catfish symbol, sometimes stylized, even, in some cases, represented by just a horizontal line. This simplified spelling appears to be related to the formality of the context. In every case that a serekh is shown on a work of stone or an official seal impression, it has both symbols. But, in most cases, where the name is shown on a piece of pottery or a rock inscription, just the catfish, or a simplified version of it appears.

Two alternative spellings of Narmer's name have also been found. On a mud sealing from Tarkhan, the symbol for the ṯꜣj-bird (Gardiner sign G47 "duckling") has been added to the two symbols for ″Narmer″ within the serekh. This has been interpreted as meaning "Narmer the masculine"; however, according to Ilona Regulski, "The third sign (the [ṯꜣj]-bird) is not an integral part of the royal name since it occurs so infrequently." Godron suggested that the extra sign is not part of the name, but was put inside the serekh for compositional convenience.

In addition, two necropolis seals from Abydos show the name in a unique way: While the chisel is shown conventionally where the catfish would be expected, there is a symbol that has been interpreted by several scholars as an animal skin. According to Dreyer, it is probably a catfish with a bull's tail, similar to the image of Narmer on the Narmer Palette in which he is shown wearing a bull's tail as a symbol of power.

Reign
The date commonly given for the beginning of Narmer's reign is c. 3100 BC. Other mainstream estimates, using both the historical method and radiocarbon dating, are in the range c. 3273–2987 BC.
Unification of Upper and Lower Egypt
The famous Narmer Palette, discovered by James E. Quibell in the 1897–1898 season at Hierakonpolis, shows Narmer wearing the crown of Upper Egypt on one side of the palette, and the crown of Lower Egypt on the other side, giving rise to the theory that Narmer unified the two lands. Since its discovery, however, it has been debated whether the Narmer Palette represents an actual historic event or is purely symbolic. Of course, the Narmer Palette could represent an actual historical event while at the same time having a symbolic significance.

In 1993, Günter Dreyer discovered a "year label" of Narmer at Abydos, depicting the same event that is depicted on the Narmer Palette. In the First Dynasty, years were identified by the name of the king and an important event that occurred in that year. A "year label" was typically attached to a container of goods and included the name of the king, a description or representation of the event that identified the year, and a description of the attached goods. This year label shows that the Narmer Palette depicts an actual historical event. Support for this conclusion (in addition to Dreyer) includes Wilkinson and Davies & Friedman. Although this interpretation of the year label is the dominant opinion among Egyptologists, there are exceptions including Baines and Wengrow.

Archaeological evidence suggests that Egypt was at least partially unified during the reigns of Ka and Iry-Hor (Narmer's immediate predecessors), and perhaps as early as Scorpion I (several generations before Iry-Hor). Tax collection is probably documented for Ka and Iry-Hor. The evidence for a role for Scorpion I in Lower Egypt comes from his tomb Uj in Abydos (Upper Egypt), where labels were found identifying goods from Lower Egypt. These are not tax documents, however, so they are probably indications of trade rather than subjugation. There is a substantial difference in the quantity and distribution of inscriptions with the names of those earlier kings in Lower Egypt and Canaan (which was reached through Lower Egypt), compared to the inscriptions of Narmer. Ka's inscriptions have been found in three sites in Lower Egypt and one in Canaan. Iry-Hor inscriptions have also been found in two sites in Lower Egypt and one in Canaan. This must be compared to Narmer, whose serekhs have been found in ten sites in Lower Egypt and nine sites in Canaan (see discussion in "Tomb and Artefacts" section). This demonstrates a qualitative difference between Narmer's role in Lower Egypt compared to his two immediate predecessors. There is no evidence in Lower Egypt of any Upper Egyptian king's presence before Iry-Hor. The archaeological evidence suggest that the unification began before Narmer, but was completed by him through the conquest of a polity in the North-West Delta as depicted on the Narmer Palette.

The importance that Narmer attached to his "unification" of Egypt is shown by the fact that it is commemorated not only on the Narmer Palette, but on a cylinder seal, the Narmer Year Label, and the Narmer Boxes; and the consequences of the event are commemorated on the Narmer Macehead. The importance of the unification to ancient Egyptians is shown by the fact that Narmer is shown as the first king on the two necropolis seals, and under the name Menes, the first king in the later King Lists. Although there is archaeological evidence of a few kings before Narmer, none of them are mentioned in any of those sources. It can be accurately said that from the point of view of Ancient Egyptians, history began with Narmer and the unification of Egypt, and that everything before him was relegated to the realm of myth.

Peak of Egyptian presence in Canaan
If this is correct (and assuming it refers to Narmer), it was undoubtedly to the land of Canaan where Narmer's serekh has been identified at nine different sites. An Egyptian presence in Canaan predates Narmer, but after about 200 years of active presence in Canaan, Egyptian presence peaked during Narmer's reign and quickly declined afterwards. The relationship between Egypt and Canaan "began around the end of the fifth millennium and apparently came to an end sometime during the Second Dynasty when it ceased altogether." It peaked during the Dynasty 0 through the reign of Narmer. Dating to this period are 33 Egyptian serekhs found in Canaan, among which 20 have been attributed to Narmer. Prior to Narmer, only one serekh of Ka and one inscription with Iry-Hor's name have been found in Canaan. The serekhs earlier than Iry-Hor are either generic serekhs that do not refer to a specific king, or are for kings not attested in Abydos. Indicative of the decline of Egyptian presence in the region after Narmer, only one serekh attributed to his successor, Hor-Aha, has been found in Canaan. Even this one example is questionable, Wilkinson does not believe there are any serekhs of Hor-Aha outside Egypt and very few serekhs of kings for the rest of the first two dynasties have been found in Canaan.

The Egyptian presence in Canaan is best demonstrated by the presence of pottery made from Egyptian Nile clay and found in Canaan, as well as pottery made from local clay, but in the Egyptian style. The latter suggests the existence of Egyptian colonies rather than just trade.

The nature of Egypt's role in Canaan has been vigorously debated, between scholars who suggest a military invasion and others proposing that only trade and colonization were involved. Although the latter has gained predominance, the presence of fortifications at Tell es-Sakan dating to the Dynasty 0 through early Dynasty 1 period, and built almost entirely using an Egyptian style of construction, demonstrate that there must have also been some kind of Egyptian military presence.

Regardless of the nature of Egypt's presence in Canaan, control of trade to (and through) Canaan was important to Ancient Egypt. Narmer probably did not establish Egypt's initial influence in Canaan by a military invasion, but a military campaign by Narmer to re-assert Egyptian authority, or to increase its sphere of influence in the region, is certainly plausible. In addition to the quote by Manetho, and the large number of Narmer serekhs found in Canaan, a recent reconstruction of a box of Narmer's by Dreyer may have commemorated a military campaign in Canaan. It may also represent just the presentation of tribute to Narmer by Canaanites.

Neithhotep
Narmer and Hor-Aha's names were both found in what is believed to be Neithhotep's tomb, which led Egyptologists to conclude that she was Narmer's queen and mother of Hor-Aha. Neithhotep's name means "Neith is satisfied". This suggests that she was a princess of Lower Egypt (based on the fact that Neith is the patron goddess of Sais in the Western Delta, exactly the area Narmer conquered to complete the unification of Egypt), and that this was a marriage to consolidate the two regions of Egypt. The fact that her tomb is in Naqada, in Upper Egypt, has led some to the conclusion that she was a descendant of the predynastic rulers of Naqada who ruled prior to its incorporation into a united Upper Egypt. It has also been suggested that the Narmer Macehead commemorates this wedding. However, the discovery in 2012 of rock inscriptions in Sinai by Pierre Tallet raise questions about whether she was really Narmer's wife. Neithhotep is probably the earliest, non-mythical, woman in history whose name is known to us today.

Tomb and artefacts
Tomb

Narmer's tomb in Umm el-Qa'ab near Abydos in Upper Egypt consists of two joined chambers (B17 and B18), lined in mud brick. Although both Émile Amélineau and Petrie excavated tombs B17 and B18, it was only in 1964 that Kaiser identified them as being Narmer's. Narmer's tomb is located next to the tombs of Ka, who likely ruled Upper Egypt just before Narmer, and Hor-Aha, who was his immediate successor.

As the tomb dates back more than 5,000 years, and has been pillaged, repeatedly, from antiquity to modern times, it is amazing that anything useful could be discovered in it. Because of the repeated disturbances in Umm el-Qa'ab, many articles of Narmer's were found in other graves, and objects of other kings, were recovered in Narmer's grave. However, Flinders Petrie during the period 1899–1903, and, starting in the 1970s, the German Archaeological Institute (DAI) have made discoveries of the greatest importance to the history of Early Egypt by their re-excavation of the tombs of Umm el-Qa'ab.

Despite the chaotic condition of the cemetery, inscriptions on both wood and bone, seal impressions, as well as dozens of flint arrowheads were found. (Petrie says with dismay that "hundreds" of arrowheads were discovered by "the French", presumably Amélineau. What happened to them is not clear, but none ended up in the Cairo Museum.) Flint knives and a fragment of an ebony chair leg were also discovered in Narmer's tomb, all of which might be part of the original funerary assemblage. The flint knives and fragment of a chair leg were not included in any of Petrie's publications, but are now at the Petrie Museum of Egyptian Archaeology (University College London), registration numbers UC35679, UC52786, and UC35682. According to Dreyer, these arrowheads are probably from the tomb of Djer, where similar arrowheads were found.

It is likely that all of the kings of Ancient Egypt buried in Umm el-Qa'ab had funerary enclosures in Abydos' northern cemetery, near the cultivation line. These were characterized by large mud brick walls that enclosed space in which funerary ceremonies are believed to have taken place. Eight enclosures have been excavated, two of which have not been definitely identified. While it has yet to be confirmed, one of these unidentified funerary enclosures may have belonged to Narmer.

Artifacts

Narmer is well attested throughout Egypt, southern Canaan and Sinai: altogether 98 inscriptions at 26 sites. At Abydos and Hierakonpolis Narmer's name appears both within a serekh and without reference to a serekh. At every other site except Coptos, Narmer's name appears in a serekh. In Egypt, his name has been found at 17 sites: 4 in Upper Egypt (Hierakonpolis, Naqada, Abydos,  and Coptos); ten in Lower Egypt (Tarkhan, Helwan, Zawyet el'Aryan, Tell Ibrahim Awad, Ezbet el-Tell, Minshat Abu Omar, Saqqara, Buto, Tell el-Farkha, and Kafr Hassan Dawood); one in the Eastern Desert (Wadi el-Qaash); and two in the Western Desert (Kharga Oasis and Gebel Tjauti).

During Narmer's reign, Egypt had an active economic presence in southern Canaan. Pottery sherds have been discovered at several sites, both from pots made in Egypt and imported to Canaan and others made in the Egyptian style out of local materials. Twenty serekhs have been found in Canaan that may belong to Narmer, but seven of those are uncertain or controversial. These serekhs came from eight different sites: Tel Arad, En Besor (Ein HaBesor), Tel es-Sakan, Nahal Tillah (Halif Terrace), Tel Erani (Tel Gat), Small Tel Malhata, Tel Ma'ahaz, and Tel Lod,

Narmer's serekh, along with those of other Predynastic and Early Dynastic kings, has been found at the Wadi 'Ameyra in the southern Sinai, where inscriptions commemorate Egyptian mining expeditions to the area.

Nag el-Hamdulab
First recorded at the end of the 19th century, an important series of rock carvings at Nag el-Hamdulab near Aswan was rediscovered in 2009, and its importance only realized then. Among the many inscriptions, tableau 7a shows a man wearing a headdress similar to the White Crown of Upper Egypt and carrying a scepter. He is followed by a man with a fan. He is then preceded by two men with standards, and accompanied by a dog. Apart from the dog motif, this scene is similar to scenes on the Scorpion Macehead and the recto of the Narmer Palette. The man, equipped with pharaonic regalia (the crown and scepter), can clearly be identified as a king. Although no name appears in the tableau, Darnell attributes it to Narmer, based on the iconography, and suggests that it might represent an actual visit to the region by Narmer for a "Following of Horus" ritual. In an interview in 2012, Gatto also describes the king in the inscription as Narmer. However, Hendricks (2016) places the scene slightly before Narmer, based, in part on the uncharacteristic absence of Narmer's royal name in the inscription.

Popular culture
 The First Pharaoh (The First Dynasty Book 1) by Lester Picker is a fictionalized biography of Narmer. The author consulted with Egyptologist Günter Dreyer to achieve authenticity.
 Murder by the Gods: An Ancient Egyptian Mystery by William G. Collins is a thriller about Prince Aha (later king Hor-Aha), with Narmer included in a secondary role.
 Pharaoh: The boy who conquered the Nile by Jackie French is a children's book (ages 10–14) about the adventures of Prince Narmer.
 ‘’The Third Gate by Lincoln Child is the third book in the Jeremy Logan series and revolves primarily around the discovery and exploration of a fictional secret burial place of Narmer.
 Warframe uses Narmer's name for a faction added in The New War update that shares some similarities to the Pharaoh's reign.

Gallery

See also
List of Pharaohs

Notes

References

Bibliography

 .
 
 .
 .
 .
 .
 .
 . 
 
 .
 .
 .
 .
 .
 .
 
 .
 .
 .
 .
 
 .
 .
 . 
 .
 .
 .
 .
 .
 .
 
 .
 .
 .
 .
 .
 .
 .
 .
 
 .
 .
.
 . Available online .
 
 .
 .
 .
 .
 .
 
 . 
 .
 . 
  .
 
 .
 .
 .
 .
 .
 .
 .
 .
 .
 .
 .
 .
 .
 .
 
 
 .
 
 .
 .
 .
 .
 .
 .
 . 
 .
 .
 .
 .
 .
 .
 .
 .
 .
 
.
 
 . 
 .
 . 
 .
 .
 .
 .
 .
 .
 .
 .
 .
 .
 .
 . 
 . 
 
 .
 
 . 
 .
 . 
 .
 .
 .
 .
 .
 .

Further reading
Davis, Whitney. 1992. Masking the Blow: The Scene of Representation In Late Prehistoric Egyptian Art. Berkeley: University of California Press.
Goldwasser, Orly. 1992. "The Narmer Palette and the 'Triumph of Metaphor'." Lingua Aegyptia 2: 67–85.
Muhlestein, Kerry. 2011. Violence In the Service of Order: The Religious Framework for Sanctioned Killing In Ancient Egypt. Oxford: Archaeopress.
Ray, John D. 2003. "The Name of King Narmer." Lingua Aegyptia 11: 131–38.
Shaw, Ian. 2004. Ancient Egypt: A Very Short Introduction. Oxford: Oxford University Press.
Takacs, Gabor. 1997. "Note on the Name of King Narmer." Linguistica 37, no. 1: 53–58.
Wengrow, David. 2001. "Rethinking 'Cattle Cults' in Early Egypt: Towards a Prehistoric Perspective on the Narmer Palette." Cambridge Archaeological Journal 11, no. 1: 91–104.
Wilkinson, Toby A. H. 2000. "What a King Is This: Narmer and the Concept of the Ruler." Journal of Egyptian Archaeology 86: 24–32.
Williams, Bruce, Thomas J. Logan, and William J. Murnane. 1987. "The Metropolitan Museum Knife Handle and Aspects of Pharaonic Imagery before Narmer." Journal of Near Eastern Studies 46, no. 4: 245–85.

External links

 The Narmer Catalog
 Database of Early Dynastic Inscriptions
 Early Egyptian Queen Revealed in 5,000-Year Old Hieroglyphs
 Photos: 5,000-Year Old Hieroglyphs Discovered in Sinai Desert.
 Hierakonpolis: City of the Hawk

 
32nd-century BC Pharaohs
31st-century BC Pharaohs
Pharaohs of the First Dynasty of Egypt